XHNGS-FM 96.7 is a radio station owned by MVS Radio located in Nogales, Sonora, Mexico. The station carries MVS's La Mejor Regional Mexican format.

History
XHNGS received its concession on May 31, 1991. It was owned by José Manuel Aguirre Gómez. In 1994, Aguirre Gómez sold XHNGS to Radio Globo Nogales. Until 2013, it was known as FM Globo, even when that format was replaced across most of MVS Radio.

In 2013, XHNGS finally left the FM Globo format to flip to La Mejor.

References

Radio stations in Sonora
Nogales, Sonora
1991 establishments in Mexico
MVS Radio